Alpine Lake is an alpine lake in Custer County, Idaho, United States, located high in the Sawtooth Mountains in the Sawtooth National Recreation Area. The Iron Creek trailhead can be accessed from State Highway 21 via Sawtooth National Forest road 619. There is another lake with the name Alpine Lake in the central part of the Sawtooth Wilderness.

With a surface elevation of 7,828 feet (2,386 m) above sea level, Alpine Lake can remain frozen into early summer. At the south end of Alpine Lake is Alpine Peak at 9,861 feet (3,006 m) above sea level. Less than a half mile southwest of Alpine Lake is Sawtooth Lake, one of the most popular destinations in the Sawtooth National Recreation Area. Alpine Lake is in the Sawtooth Wilderness and wilderness permit can be obtained at trailheads.

References

See also
 List of lakes of the Sawtooth Mountains (Idaho)
 Sawtooth National Forest
 Sawtooth National Recreation Area
 Sawtooth Range (Idaho)

Lakes of Idaho
Lakes of Custer County, Idaho
Glacial lakes of the United States
Glacial lakes of the Sawtooth Wilderness